

Arthropods

Newly named insects

Conodonts 
German paleontologist Klaus J. Müller (1923-2010) described the conodont family Westergaardodinidae.

Archosauromorphs

Incertae sedis

Newly named pseudosuchians

Newly named dinosaurs
Data courtesy of George Olshevsky's dinosaur genera list.

Plesiosaurs

Newly named Plesiosaurs

Birds

Newly named birds

Pterosaurs

New taxa

References

1950s in paleontology
Paleontology
Paleontology 9